The Socotá Formation (Kis) is a geological formation of the Altiplano Cundiboyacense, Eastern Ranges of the Colombian Andes. The formation hosts ammonite fossils.

Etymology 
The formation was defined as a thicker sequence and named in 1969 by Cáceres and Etayo after Socotá, a vereda of Apulo, Cundinamarca. The name Socotá in Muysccubun, the language of the native Muisca, means either "Land of the Sun and farmfields" or "Good harvest".

Description

Lithologies 
Fossils of the ammonites Stoyanowiceras treffryanus, Dufrenoyia sanctorum, Parahoplites (?) hubachi, and Acanthoplites (?) leptoceratiforme have been found in the Socotá Formation.

Stratigraphy and depositional environment 
The Socotá Formation overlies the Trincheras Formation and is partly overlain by and partly time equivalent with the El Peñón Formation. In other areas, the formation underlies the Capotes and Hiló Formations. The age has been estimated to be Late Aptian. Stratigraphically, the formation is time equivalent with the Tablazo, Caballos and Une Formations. The formation has been deposited in a marine platform environment. in terms of sequence stratigraphy, the Socotá Formation is part of a transgressive cycle.

Outcrops 

The Socotá Formation is apart from its type locality, found from Viotá in the south to Útica in the north. The formation crops out on both sides of the Bogotá River in Anapoima and Apulo.

Regional correlations

See also 

 Geology of the Eastern Hills
 Geology of the Ocetá Páramo
 Geology of the Altiplano Cundiboyacense

References

Bibliography

Maps

External links 
 

Geologic formations of Colombia
Cretaceous Colombia
Lower Cretaceous Series of South America
Aptian Stage
Sandstone formations
Shale formations
Open marine deposits
Formations
Geography of Cundinamarca Department
Muysccubun